This article lists players who have captained the Cork intermediate hurling team in the Munster Intermediate Hurling Championship and the All-Ireland Intermediate Hurling Championship.

List of captains

See also
List of Cork senior hurling team captains
List of Cork under-21 hurling team captains
List of Cork minor hurling team captains

References

 
Hurling
Cork